Hotel Florida may refer to:

Hotel Florida (Havana)
Hotel Florida (Lerici)
Hotel Florida (Madrid)
Hotel Florida Milan
Hotel Florida (Venice)